is a 2012 Japanese kaiju short film directed by Shinji Higuchi. A live-action prequel and spin-off of Hayao Miyazaki's 1984 anime film Nausicaä of the Valley of the Wind, the film is a co-production between Studio Ghibli, Special Effects Laboratory Co., Ltd, and Khara, Inc. In the film, a woman from Tokyo recounts how her city was obliterated within hours by giant divine warriors.

Plot
As mysterious orange spores appear in Tokyo, an unnamed female resident of the city receives a strange visit from her brother who tells her that the city will be destroyed tomorrow and she should leave beforehand. Due to her belief that it is merely a rumor on the internet, she dismisses his warning and does not inform her fellow city residents of the supposed danger.

The following day, the orange spores combine over Tokyo to form a Giant God Warrior hovering in the sky. As the being descends upon the city, it shrinks to the size of a large building. After observing its surroundings, the warrior opens its mouth to reveal a weapon that shoots red bullets and a purple laser beam called the proton beam. A direct opposite of the Genesis creation narrative is displayed onscreen as the city is destroyed. An army of Giant God Warriors then can be seen walking holding spear-like objects in a blazing Tokyo.

Following this event, the warriors launched an event known as Seven Days of Fire, which destroyed most of the human civilization on Earth and recreated the planet's ecosystem.

Production

Design
The design of the film's giant creature was provided by Hayao Miyazaki, from his manga series Nausicaä of the Valley of the Wind.

Special effects
The film was Studio Ghibli's first live-action production and features exclusive use of digital composition techniques and special effects technology. Some of the miniatures used in the film were previously constructed, used, and stored at Toho Studios, Marbling Fine Arts, and Special Effects Laboratory Co., Ltd.

Release

Theatrical
Giant God Warrior Appears in Tokyo received a theatrical release in Japan on November 17, 2012, preceding Evangelion: 3.0 You Can (Not) Redo. Director Shinji Higuchi decided to add new sound effects and give the Giant God Warriors new computer-generated wings in the final scene of the film for its theatrical release.

Reception

Accolades
On February 23, 2013, the film received the VFX-JAPAN Award for CM, Hakuten Video Division.

Notes

References

External links

Official web page for the film's exhibition at the Museum of Contemporary Art Tokyo

2010s Japanese films
2012 short films
2012 films
Studio Ghibli
Khara
Kaiju films
Tokusatsu films
Films directed by Shinji Higuchi
Films set in Tokyo
2010s Japanese-language films